Nishan Dhanasinghe (born 16 August 1966) is a Sri Lankan former first-class cricketer who played for Singha Sports Club.

References

External links
 

1966 births
Living people
Sri Lankan cricketers
Singha Sports Club cricketers
People from Ambalangoda